Rafael Nadal defeated Gaël Monfils in the final, 7–5, 5–7, 6–0 to win the singles tennis title at the 2016 Monte-Carlo Masters. It was his record-extending ninth Monte-Carlo Masters title.

Novak Djokovic was the defending champion, but lost in the second round to Jiří Veselý.

Seeds
The top eight seeds receive a bye into the second round.

Draw

Finals

Top half

Section 1

Section 2

Bottom half

Section 3

Section 4

Qualifying

Seeds

Qualifiers

Lucky losers

Qualifying draw

First qualifier

Second qualifier

Third qualifier

Fourth qualifier

Fifth qualifier

Sixth qualifier

Seventh qualifier

External links
 Main draw
 Qualifying draw

Singles